The fakaseasea is a tradition dance song of Tuvalu. Dancing songs are the most common type of the traditional Tuvaluan songs, with other tradition dance styles including fakanau and fatele.

Tuvaluan dance music

Dancing songs are the most common type of traditional Tuvaluan songs.  Older style dancing songs were known to be performed while sitting, kneeling or standing. The two primary traditional dances of Tuvalu are the fakanau (for men) and oga (for women) and the fakaseasea.
The modern fatele involves the women on their feet, dancing in lines; with the men facing the dancers, sitting on the floor beating the time with their hands on the mats or on wooden boxes, such as tea chests.

Performance of the fakaseasea
The fakaseasea was mainly performed by women, who were on their feet, dancing and moving their arms, hand and upper body; while men and women would sing and beat the time. It is a slower song with very loose rules on how to dance to it, with variations  on different islands with different names. The fakaseasea tradition continues in the present day although performed mainly by elders.

References

Further reading
 Christensen, Dieter, Old Musical Styles in the Ellice Islands, Western Polynesia, Ethnomusicology, 8:1 (1964), 34–40.
 Christensen, Dieter and Gerd Koch, Die Musik der Ellice-Inseln, Berlin: Museum fur Volkerkunde, (1964)
 Koch, Gerd, Songs of Tuvalu (translated by Guy Slatter), Institute of Pacific Studies, University of the South Pacific (2000)  
 Linkels, Ad. The Real Music of Paradise (2000). In Broughton, Simon and Ellingham, Mark with McConnachie, James and Duane, Orla (Ed.), World Music, Vol. 2: Latin & North America, Caribbean, India, Asia and Pacific, pp 218–229. Rough Guides Ltd, Penguin Books. 
 

Dances of Polynesia
Tuvaluan music
Tuvaluan culture